Stanley Lloyd Kaufman Jr. (born December 30, 1945) is an American film director, screenwriter, producer and actor. Alongside producer Michael Herz, he is the co-founder of Troma Entertainment film studio, and the director of many of their feature films, such as The Toxic Avenger and Tromeo and Juliet. Many of the strategies employed by him at Troma have been credited with making the film industry significantly more accessible and decentralized.

Early life
Kaufman was born to a Jewish family in New York City, the son of Ruth (née Fried) and Stanley Lloyd Kaufman Sr., a lawyer.

Career

Early career

Kaufman graduated from Yale University with the class of 1968, where he majored in Chinese studies. His fellow Yale classmates included Oliver Stone and George W. Bush.  Originally intending to become a social worker, he became fast friends with student filmmaker Robert Edelstein and Eric Sherman (son of filmmaker Vincent Sherman), who introduced him to his future lifelong obsession, cinema. Some of Lloyd's favorite filmmakers include John Ford, Kenji Mizoguchi, Ernst Lubitsch, Stan Brakhage and Franklin Schaffner.

In 1966, Lloyd went on a hiatus from his studies and spent a year in Chad for USAID as a pathfinder for the Peace Corps.

Returning to Yale, he produced Robert Edelstein's low-budget film Rappaccini and directed his own first feature film, an experimental black and white film titled The Girl Who Returned (1969). The film was presented at film societies at Yale, Harvard, and other east coast institutions. Following his graduation, Kaufman went on to work for Cannon Films, where he met John G. Avildsen (future Academy Award-winning director of Rocky and The Karate Kid). The two collaborated for several years, making low-budget films including Joe (1970) and Cry Uncle! (1971). During this period, Kaufman also directed and starred in his second feature film, The Battle of Love's Return (1971), which garnered positive reviews in publications such as The New York Times; wrote and co-produced the lesbian thriller Sugar Cookies (1973) with Oliver Stone; and wrote and directed the Israeli comedy flop, Big Gus, What's the Fuss? (1973). Kaufman also served as executive in charge of locations for Saturday Night Fever (1977), and was influential in choosing 2001 Odyssey as the nightclub in the film.

From 1973 to 1979, Kaufman produced and directed a handful of adult films in New York under the pseudonym "Louis Su". He directed at least three movies: The Divine Obsession, The Newcomers and Sweet & Sour, and has been credited for producing at least three more.

Troma Studios
In 1974, Kaufman and his business partner Michael Herz founded Troma Entertainment and began producing and distributing independent action and comedy films. In order to pay the bills, Kaufman did some freelance work for major Hollywood productions, including Rocky (edited on Troma's flatbed machines), Saturday Night Fever, and The Final Countdown, which he also produced (Kaufman has said that it was his experience on this film that made him never want to deal with a major studio again). From 1979 to 1981, the two wrote, produced and directed a series of profitable "sexy comedies" including Squeeze Play!, Waitress!, Stuck on You! and The First Turn-On!. On most of these early films, Kaufman is credited as "Samuel Weil." Kaufman also made a small appearance in Rocky and served as the production manager on Louis Malle's My Dinner With Andre.

In 1985, Troma experienced mainstream success with the violent, darkly comic superhero film The Toxic Avenger. Toxic went on to become Troma's most popular movie, inspiring two sequels, a fourth independent film sequel, a Saturday morning children's television show, comic books and tons of merchandise. The Toxic Avenger, or "Toxie," is now Troma's official mascot.

Kaufman's follow-up to The Toxic Avenger was Class of Nuke 'Em High, which he co-directed with Richard W. Haines. Riding on the success of the Toxic Avenger, Nuke 'em inspired two sequels, a fourth independent film sequel, and a healthy run on late night cable shows such as USA Up All Night. At one time, Class of Nuke 'Em High was the highest-selling VHS for Troma.

Troma's popularity waned after the box office failure of Troma's War, a contributing factor to the company's collapse as a major film studio, forcing the Kaufman to eventually downsize his business into an independent film studio. Kaufman attributed the film's lack of success to cuts made to the movie after the MPAA refused to release it with an R-rating in its intended form. Troma's attempt to regain its popularity with the superhero satire Sgt. Kabukiman N.Y.P.D. was unsuccessful, failing to make an impression at the box office. From 1995 to 2000, Kaufman retrofitted the studio into an independent film company, finding success amongst cult movie fans and critics with the independent film Tromeo and Juliet (1996), a loose parody of Shakespeare's play. Other independent films that followed were the less successful and poorly reviewed. Terror Firmer (1999), a slasher film set on the set of a Troma movie (with Kaufman playing a caricature of himself), and the fourth installment, Citizen Toxie: The Toxic Avenger IV which proved to be an ultimately unsuccessful revival of the series, both films failing to make an impression at the box office.

It would not be long, however, before Troma would once again experience financial hardship, this time after the expensive botched funding of a low-budget video feature titled Tales from the Crapper, which cost $250,000 despite most of the footage being unusable. Lloyd supervised a reshoot in an attempt to salvage the film, dividing the footage into two parts, and recasting the film as a double-feature. Tales from the Crapper was released on DVD in September 2004.

Troma still produces and acquires independent films. Troma Films has distributed many films from third parties including Trey Parker's Cannibal! The Musical. Lloyd himself encourages independent filmmaking, making cameo appearances in low-budget horror films, often for free. Appearances include screen time in former collaborator James Gunn's directing debut, Slither, as well as Gunn's Super; and Mark Neveldine and Brian Taylor's Gamer.

Kaufman's long-time editor Gabriel Friedman co-directed and wrote the screenplay to his follow-up film, Poultrygeist: Night of the Chicken Dead, a musical zom-com which made its official New York premiere on May 9, 2008 (although the film had previewed numerous times on single screens for over a year). The film opened to positive reviews from Entertainment Weekly and The New York Times. Poultrygeist grossed $22,623 in the United States and Canada.

In September 2008, a staged musical version of The Toxic Avenger opened at the George Street Playhouse in New Brunswick, New Jersey. Directed by Tony Award winner John Rando, The Toxic Avenger Musical features music from Bon Jovi founding member, David Bryan. On September 17, 2009, Kaufman announced he would have a cameo in the remake of the Charles Kaufman/Troma movie Mother's Day alongside his brother Charles.

Kaufman is the subject of the forthcoming book Toxic Schlock: Conversations with Lloyd Kaufman by Andrew J. Rausch and Chris Watson. An author himself, Kaufman has most recently been working on adding to his Your Own Damn Movie! series. Having completed Make Your Own Damn Movie!, Direct Your Own Damn Movie! and Produce Your Own Damn Movie!, he is now working on Sell Your Own Damn Movie!.

In 2010, Troma produced Father's Day, a shocking film from Canadian powerhouse Astron-6. Kaufman appeared on the Discovery Channel series, Oddities, on season 3 episode ten.

In 2012, Kaufman starred in the anthology horror film Horror House, playing Joe the Real Estate Agent in each of the film's five story scenarios.

On April 30, 2013, Kaufman appeared on an episode of Angry Video Game Nerd, reviewing the video game Toxic Crusaders on various consoles. Kaufman also appears in Angry Video Game Nerd: The Movie as himself, and was interviewed by James Rolfe.

In December 2013, Lloyd Kaufman revealed on the podcast Chimichanga Talk that he found lost behind-the-scenes footage of the film Rocky. Kaufman directed this footage and it was shot on Super-8. He also stated that he has completed a commentary of the footage and that it will be included in the 40th Anniversary release of Rocky on Blu-ray and DVD.

In 2013, Troma premiered Return to Class of Nuke 'Em High Vol.1 (2013) at the Cannes Film Festival. Return to Nuke 'Em High: Vol. 1 was a collaboration between Troma and Starz/Anchor Bay, it is also the first film Kaufman has directed on digital. The film has been well received premiering all over the world picking up awards and critical praise along the way. The New York Times stated "Powered by ribald bursts of bad taste and bodily fluids... The overall effect is [sic] joyous." Fangoria said "Return to Nuke 'Em High: Vol. 1 is undeniably funny, brave and so unlike anything else being put out today that it practically demands respect."

The Museum of Modern Art selected Return to Nuke 'Em High: Vol. 1 as part of its prestigious "Contenders" series - a collection of influential, innovative films made in the past 12 months that are believed will stand the test of time - honoring Kaufman along with fellow directors David Lynch, Woody Allen, the Coen Brothers, and Sofia Coppola.

In 2020, Kaufman released #ShakespearesSh*tstorm, his iteration of William Shakespeare's The Tempest, a spiritual sequel to Tromeo and Juliet.

In 2021, Kaufman served as producer on the Troma films, Brandon Bassham's Slashening: The Final Beginning & Mercedes The Muses's Divide & Conquer. In addition to his usual Troma Entertainment duties, Lloyd, along with Michael Herz served as Executive Producer on the Legendary Pictures reboot of The Toxic Avenger, directed by Macon Blair and set for a 2022 release date.

Also due to be released from Lloyd Kaufman and Troma Entertainment in 2022 are the feature films, Ben Johnson's Curse of the Were Deer, Chris Downie's Buggers and Thom DeMicco's Swing Life Away.

Filmography

As director
All films from Waitress to Sgt. Kabukiman N.Y.P.D. were co-directed with college friend and Troma Vice President Michael Herz
The Girl Who Returned (1969)
The Battle of Love's Return (1971)
Big Gus, What's the Fuss? (1973) (co-directed by Ami Artzi)
Squeeze Play! (1979) (as Samuel Weil)
Waitress! (1981) (as Samuel Weil)
Stuck on You! (1982) (as Samuel Weil)
The First Turn-On! (1983) (as Samuel Weil)
The Toxic Avenger (1984) (as Samuel Weil)
Class of Nuke 'Em High (1986) (as Samuel Weil; co-directed by Richard W. Haines)
Troma's War (1988) (as Samuel Weil)
The Toxic Avenger Part II (1989)
The Toxic Avenger Part III: The Last Temptation of Toxie (1989)
Sgt. Kabukiman N.Y.P.D. (1990)
Tromeo and Juliet (1996)
Terror Firmer (1998) (based on his book All I Need to Know about Filmmaking I Learned from The Toxic Avenger)
Troma's Edge TV (1999–2001) (26 half-hour episodes)
Citizen Toxie: The Toxic Avenger IV (2000)
All the Love You Cannes! (2002)
Parts of the Family (2003) (as Gabriel Lloyd) (co-directed by Léon Paul De Bruyn)
Tales from the Crapper (2004)
Make Your Own Damn Movie! (2005)
Poultrygeist: Night of the Chicken Dead (2006)
Splendor & Wisdom (2008)
Direct Your Own Damn Movie (2009)
Produce Your Own Damn Movie! (2010)
Return to Nuke 'Em High Volume 1 (2013)
Grindsploitation: segment Untitled (2017)
Return to Return to Nuke 'Em High AKA Volume 2 (2017)
Shakespeare's Shitstorm (2020)

As producer only
Rappacini (1968)
Sugar Cookies (1973)
Silent Night, Bloody Night (1972)
Mother's Day (1980)
The Final Countdown (1980)
The Dark Side of Midnight (1984)
Screamplay (1985)
Igor and the Lunatics (1985)
Girls School Screamers (1986)
Combat Shock (1986)
Fortress of Amerikkka (1988)
Dialing for Dingbats (1989)
Class of Nuke 'Em High 2: Subhumanoid Meltdown (1991)
Class of Nuke 'Em High 3: The Good, the Bad and the Subhumanoid (1994)
Blondes Have More Guns (1995)
DeCampitated (1998)
Sucker: The Vampire (1998)
Cannes Tromatized (2000)
The Rowdy Girls (2000)
Parts of the Family (2003)
Slaughter Party (2005)
Mother's Day (2010)
Teenape vs. the Nazi Monster Apocalypse (2011)
Mr. Bricks: A Heavy Metal Murder Musical (2011)
Father's Day (2011)
Hack Job (2011)
B.C. Butcher (2016)
Revenge of the Gweilo (2016)
Dolphinman Battles the Sex Lobster (2016, video short)
Grindsploitation (2016, Presents)
Spidarlings (2016, Presents)
Troma's Monster Kill (2016-2017, TV Series)
Return to... Return to Nuke 'Em High AKA Vol. 2 (2017)
Another Yeti a Love Story: Life on the Streets (2017)
Heart of Fartness: Troma's First VR Experience Starring the Toxic Avenger (2017, short)
F#ck You Lloyd Kaufman: An Interview from Hell (2017, short)
Crude (2017, short)
Slash Slashes with Guns and Hoe-ses! (2017, short)
Sgt. Ka-Spooky-Man's Cray-Cray VR Halloween Extravaganza (2017, video short)
Troma Now presents: A Stankmouth New Year's Eve Special (2018, Video short)
Kabukiman's Cocktail Corner: Loaded in Las Vegas (2018, video short)
Troma Now presents: Tromanda's Tromantic Transformation (2018, video short)
Troma Now presents: March Tromamania Madness (2018, video short)
Festival to Fascism: Cannes 2017 (2018, short)
Troma Presents: Spidarlings Behind the Scenes (2018, documentary short)
Mutant Blast (2018)
Vampire Hooker Hotel (2018, short)
The Toxic Avenger: The Musical (2018)
After School Lunch Special (2019)
2 Girls, 1 Duck (2019, making-of documentary for Return to... Return to Nuke 'Em High AKA Vol. 2)
Blood Stab (2010, short)
#ShakespearesShitstorm (2020)
Latched (2020, short)
This Night's End (2020, short)
Hannya Girl (2020, short)
Tromafist (2020, video short)
Slashening: The Final Beginning (2021)
Jun (2021, short)
Divide & Conquer (2022)
The Toxic Avenger (TBA)

As actor
The Battle of Love's Return (1971) - Abacrombie
Cry Uncle! (1971) - Hippie #2
The Love Thrill Murders (1971) - Squeegee
Rocky (1976) - Drunk
Slow Dancing in the Big City (1979) - Usher
The Final Countdown (1980) - Commander Kaufman
Rocky V (1990) - Drunk (Scenes Deleted)
Cannes Man (1996) - Troma Chief
Tromeo and Juliet (1996) - Bar Patron (Uncredited)
Orgazmo (1997) - Doctor
Terror Firmer (1998) - Larry Benjamin
West Hollywood Stories, Volume One (1999) - The Nun
Citizen Toxie: The Toxic Avenger IV (2000) - Man in Public Service Announcement
Tomorrow by Midnight (2001) - Video Store Manager
Pretty Cool (2002) - Mr. Newman
Tales from the Crapper (2003) - The Crap Keeper
LolliLove (2003) - Father Lloyd
Comic Book: The Movie (2004) - Himself
Harry Knuckles and the Pearl Necklace (2004) - The Man in the Hat
Frankenstein vs. the Creature from Blood Cove (2005) - Bar Drunk
Slither (2006) - Sad Drunk
Attack of the Tromaggot (2006) - blackmailed citizen
Poultrygeist: Night of the Chicken Dead (2006) - Old Arbie
Misadventures in Space (2007) - Lord Admiral Kaufman 
Zeppo: Sinners from Beyond the Moon! (2007) - President Kaufman 
Bryan Loves You (2008) - Jonathan's Helper
Crank: High Voltage (2009) - Maintenance Guy #2
Gamer (2009) - Genericon
Incest Death Squad (2009) - Mr. Reamburg
The Uh-Oh! Show (2009) - Pimp
Hanger (2009) - Melvina The Tranny
The 7 Nightmares Girl (2009) - Mr. Hasselman
Klown Kamp Massacre - Vic Vickers
Super (2010) - 911 Man
Killer Hoo Ha (2010) - Man in road
Hatchet II (2010) - Hunter
Tetherball: The Movie (2010) - Larry Lewinski
Bloodbath in the House of Knives (2010) - Lawyer
Caesar and Otto meet Dracula's Lawyer (2010) - Judge Stoker Brown
Caesar and Otto's Deadly XMas (2011) - Grandpa Denovio
Hack Job (2011) - Rabbi Lloyd
Fathers Day (2011) - God
The Gunstringer (2011) - Doc Lloyd
Creep Van (2012) - Disgruntled Car Wash Customer
Evil Head (2012) - Professor Raymond Knowby (Voice Only)
Horror House (2012) - Joe the Real Estate Agent
LocoCycle (2013) - General Major Serje Krutsnetsoff
Guardians of the Galaxy (2014) - Prisoner, cameo
Angry Video Game Nerd: The Movie (2014) - Himself
Science Team (2014) - Science Team Elder
Banjo (2014)
Stick 10 Even More Swag: The United League of Stereotypes (2014) - Hoffman
Dyke Hard (2014) - Dancer
1 Chance 2 Dance (2014) - Stage presentator
The Fappening (2015) - Walter Plinge
ABCs of Superheroes (2015) - TV Anchor
Killer Rack (2015) - Dr. Foin
The Transfiguration (2016) - Hobo
Spidarlings (2016) - Mr. Banner
Blood Curse: The Haunting Of Alicia Stone (2016) - Alicia's Dad
Escaping The Dead - American Tourist, cameo
Iron Sky: The Coming Race (2016) - cameo
Cell (2016) - cameo
Diary of a Fatman (2016) - Steven Haart
Graveyard Stories (2017) - The Host
I Filmed Your Death (2017)
Death House (2017) - Dr. Chalice
Drive-In Grindhouse (2018) - Punching Bag / Police Chief (segment: The Big Blind)
Another Cinema Snob Movie (2019) - Stanley Golightly
The Black Spot (2019) - High Commander Kaufman
I Scream on the Beach! (2020) - Dr. Lloyd
I Need You Dead! (2020) - Aaron A. Applebee
Easter Bunny Bloodbath 2: No More Tears (2020) - Lloyd Kaufman
Kirk Squad (2020) - Computer TV Mini-Series
Comic Book Junkies (2020) - Toby
Toilet Horror (2020) - Lloyd Kaufman
The Last Blockbuster (2020) - Himself
Celebrity Home Tours (2020) - Lloyd Kaufman 
Shakespeare's Sh*tstorm (2020) - Prospero/Antoinette Duke
Blood Cove 2: Return of the Skull (2020) - Mayor Richards
Slashening: The Final Beginning (2020) - Master Dyson
Slutty The Clown (2020) - Professor Felatio
Amityville Hex (2021) - Hex Reader 
The Suicide Squad (2021) - Dancing man in bar (uncredited cameo)
Carnal Monsters (2021) - Professor Felatio
Grindsploitation 10: Milkin' It (2022) - YouTube Sensation (segment: "The Smell of Fear")Toxie Vs Putin (2022) - Narrator

Books
 All I Need to Know about Filmmaking I Learned from The Toxic Avenger (with James Gunn)
 Make Your Own Damn Movie (with Adam Jahnke and Trent Haaga)
 The Toxic Avenger: The Novel (with Adam Jahnke)
 Direct Your Own Damn Movie (with Sara Antill and Kurly Tlapoyawa)
 Produce Your Own Damn Movie (with Ashley Wren Collins)
 Sell Your Own Damn Movie (with Sara Antill)
 Death by Umbrella! The 100 Weirdest Horror Movie Weapons (Foreword by Lloyd Kaufman)

BibliographyAll I Need to Know about Filmmaking I Learned from The Toxic Avenger with James Gunn (1998)Make Your Own Damn Movie: Secrets of a Renegade Director with Adam Jahnke and Trent Haaga (2003)The Toxic Avenger: The Novel'' with Adam Jahnke (2006)

References

External links

Lloyd Kaufman Daughters' Memoir
Interview with AgonyBooth.com

American parodists
Parody film directors
1945 births
Living people
Film directors from New York City
Trinity School (New York City) alumni
Yale University alumni
Male actors from New York City
Comedy film directors
Horror film directors
Jewish American male actors
Peace Corps volunteers
21st-century American Jews
Postmodernist filmmakers